Bob Geary may refer to:

 Bob Geary (Canadian football) (1933–2001), player and general manager of the Montreal Alouettes
 Bob Geary (baseball) (1891–1980), American Major League Baseball pitcher
 Bob Geary (police officer), former officer in the San Francisco Police Department

See also
Robert Geary (disambiguation)